Kaya Tarakçı (born 23 April 1981 in Adana) is a retired Turkish footballer who played goalkeeper. He has been called to the Turkey national under-21 football team twice and played the second half once against Georgia national under-21 football team on 20 August 2002 where the Turkey national under-21 football team lost 0–1.

Honours 
Konyaspor
Turkish Cup: 2016–17

References

External links
 
 

1981 births
Living people
Gaziantepspor footballers
Gaskispor footballers
Gaziantep F.K. footballers
Kocaelispor footballers
Kayseri Erciyesspor footballers
Adana Demirspor footballers
Mersin İdman Yurdu footballers
Kartalspor footballers
Konyaspor footballers
Büyükşehir Belediye Erzurumspor footballers
Çaykur Rizespor footballers
Süper Lig players
TFF First League players
TFF Second League players
Turkish footballers
Turkey under-21 international footballers
Turkey youth international footballers
Association football goalkeepers